This is a list of the appointed Members of European Parliament for Spain from 1986 to 1987. The first (direct) elections were held in 1987.

List

1986 in Spain
1987 in Spain
1986
Spain